Crash Bandicoot may refer to:

 Crash Bandicoot, a video game series
 Crash Bandicoot (character), the protagonist of the series
 Crash Bandicoot (video game), the first game in the series

 Crash bandicoot, a fossil species of Crash (genus) discovered in Australia

Crash Bandicoot